Alan James Skinner (born 16 July 1942) was a rugby union player who represented Australia.

Skinner, a lock, was born in Sydney and claimed a total of 3 international rugby caps for Australia.

He graduated from Sydney Boys High School in 1959, where he played with fellow Wallabies John Brass and Peter Crittle.

References

Australian rugby union players
Australia international rugby union players
1942 births
Living people
Rugby union players from Sydney
Rugby union locks